Gisburn Forest is a civil parish in the Ribble Valley, in Lancashire, England. Mainly lying within the Forest of Bowland Area of Outstanding Natural Beauty, the parish includes the larger part of the village of Tosside and the hamlet of Grunsagill to the south. Historically, the parish lay within the West Riding of Yorkshire. It had a population of 151 at the 2011 Census.

The parish adjoins the Ribble Valley parishes of Easington, Bolton-by-Bowland and Paythorne along with Lawkland, Giggleswick, Rathmell, Wigglesworth and Halton West in the Craven district of North Yorkshire.

History
Near Brown Hills Beck on the western border of the parish is a bowl barrow thought to date from the late Neolithic or Bronze Age periods. There is another similar mound on the opposite side of the stream in Easington.

The manor of Gisburn Forest was part of the Percy Fee which was listed in the Domesday Book. Matilda de Percy, the widow of William de Beaumont, 3rd Earl of Warwick gave the grazing rights and the right to take timber to Sawley Abbey in 1189. And by 1211, her grandnephew William de Percy, 6th Baron Percy donated the manor. By 1561 the manor was among the former monastic lands owned by Henry Darcy, the son of Sir Arthur Darcy. Around the start of the 19th century the manor was claimed by Thomas Browne, who acquired the largest estate in the township from his relative Mary, the third wife of Sir Robert Burdett. Grunsagill was the centre of this estate.

Governance
The township of Gisburn Forest was part of the ancient parish of Gisburn, itself a part of the Western Division of Staincliffe Wapentake. Gisburn Forest became a civil parish in 1866, becoming part of Bowland Rural District when it was formed in 1894. In 1938 an  area in the north-west of the parish was transferred to Rathmell. In 1974 it was transferred from the West Riding of Yorkshire to the Ribble Valley district of Lancashire.

Gisburn Forest shares a parish council with two other parishes, Sawley and Bolton-by-Bowland. Along with Rimington, Middop, Gisburn, Paythorne, Newsholme and Horton, the parish forms the Gisburn, Rimington ward of Ribble Valley Borough Council.

Forestry
Forming part of the catchment area for the reservoir, today the land is largely owned by United Utilities, but since 1949 it has been leased by the Forestry Commission. Only an  area called Park Wood is classified as ancient semi-natural woodland, with the rest mainly Sitka spruce, grown for timber production. It is now a location for mountain-biking, walking and horse-riding.

Media gallery

See also

Listed buildings in Gisburn Forest
Scheduled monuments in Lancashire

References

Notes

Citations

External links

White Moss SSSI (Gisburn Forest)

Civil parishes in Lancashire
Geography of Ribble Valley
Forest of Bowland